Cantorchilus is a genus of birds in the wren family. Established by  Nigel I. Mann, F. Keith Barker, Jeff A. Graves, Kimberly A. Dingess-Mann and Peter J. B. Slater in 2006, it contains 10 species. All of the species assigned to it were previously included in the genus Thryothorus.

Species
 Stripe-breasted wren (Cantorchilus thoracicus)
 Stripe-throated wren (Cantorchilus leucopogon)
 Cabanis's wren (Cantorchilus modestus)
 Canebrake wren (Cantorchilus zeledoni)
 Isthmian wren (Cantorchilus elutus)
 Riverside wren (Cantorchilus semibadius)
 Bay wren (Cantorchilus nigricapillus)
 Superciliated wren (Cantorchilus superciliaris)
 Buff-breasted wren (Cantorchilus leucotis) (probably  not monophyletic)
 Fawn-breasted wren (Cantorchilus guarayanus)
 Long-billed wren (Cantorchilus longirostris)
 Grey wren (Cantorchilus griseus)

References

 
Bird genera
Troglodytidae